Daniel Kelly (14 October 1899 – 24 August 1941) was a Scottish professional footballer who played as an inside forward or an outside forward in Scottish football for Blantyre Victoria and Hamilton Academical, in the Football League for Derby County, Torquay United, York City and Doncaster Rovers, in Irish football for Dundalk and was on the books of Clapton Orient without making a league appearance.

He was born in Blantyre, South Lanarkshire to Daniel and Catherine Kelly. He married Catherine Devlin at St Joseph's Church, Blantyre on 7 January 1931. His certificate of marriage gives his occupation as a professional football player. He was a well respected member of the community in Blantyre. He died on 24 August 1941 aged 41 at Glasgow Royal Infirmary. His occupation at death was a spirit salesman.

References

1904 births
People from Blantyre, South Lanarkshire
Footballers from South Lanarkshire
1941 deaths
Scottish footballers
Association football forwards
Blantyre Victoria F.C. players
Hamilton Academical F.C. players
Derby County F.C. players
Torquay United F.C. players
York City F.C. players
Doncaster Rovers F.C. players
Dundalk F.C. players
Leyton Orient F.C. players
Scottish Football League players
English Football League players
Scottish Junior Football Association players